Marsden grants are the main form of contestable funding for fundamental, 'blue skies' research in New Zealand. Grants are made in all areas of research, in both science and the humanities. The grants are made from the Marsden Fund, which was established by the New Zealand Government in 1994. The Fund is administered by the Royal Society of New Zealand. Most of the grants go to researchers at New Zealand universities, but some go to researchers at Crown Research Institutes and elsewhere.

The first Marsden grants were awarded in 1995, when NZ$10.2 million (excluding GST) was shared between 51 successful projects. In 2001, the Fast Start category was introduced specifically for Early Career Researchers (within 7 years of completing their PhD). By 2018, the size of the Marsden Fund had grown to NZ$85.6 million and 136 grants were made. These included 53 Fast Start grants and 83 Standard grants. The 2018 round also introduced a new category of grant, the Marsden Fund Council Award. These larger grants are focused on interdisciplinary research; however, there were no successful applications in the initial round.

The Marsden granting process is highly competitive, with over 1,000 applications per year and success rates that  often hover around 10%. Proposals are assessed primarily on the potential of the research to contribute to the advancement of knowledge. In the 2018 funding round, the success rate was 11.2% for Standard grants and 14.8% for Fast Start grants. Because of this intense competition, winning a Marsden grant is regarded as a hallmark of research excellence in New Zealand.

Successful proposals are selected by the Marsden Fund Council. In 2022 there were 113 research projects funded nationally.

The grants are named after English-New Zealand physicist Ernest Marsden (1889–1970).

Marsden Fund Council 
The Marsden Fund Council are appointed by the New Zealand Minister for Research, Science and Innovation. In 2022 the council was made up of the following people who convene different panels: Professor Gillian Dobbie (Chair), Professor Jacqueline Beggs, Professor Penny Brothers, Professor Colin Brown, Professor Kathleen Campbell, Distinguished Professor Geoff Chase, Dr Richard Newcomb, Professor Chellie Spiller, Distinguished Professor Paul Spoonley and Professor Cynthia White.

Budget Allocations

See also

References

Grants (money)
Science and technology in New Zealand